Janet Clarke Hall (JCH) is a residential college of the University of Melbourne in Australia. The college is associated with the Anglican Province of Victoria. JCH is one of the smallest of the colleges of the university and was the first university college in Australia to admit women.

History 

Established in 1886 as a residential hostel for women students of Trinity College, JCH was originally called the 'Trinity College Hostel'. It was re-named after a significant benefactor, Janet Clarke, wife of Sir William Clarke in 1921. Enid Joske was principal of JCH from 1928 until 1952, and Dr Eva Eden was principal from 1964 until 1983. JCH became an independent college in 1961 and co-educational in 1973.

Principals of Janet Clarke Hall: 
 The Rev’d Thomas Jollie Smith (1886–87)
 Miss Lucy Waltham (1888)
 Miss Emily Eddes (1889)
 Miss Emily Hensley (1890)
 Mr J.T. Collins (1892-1900)
 Miss Lucy Bateman (1901–05)
 Miss Lucy Archer (1906–18)
 Miss Margery Herring (1919–27)
 Miss Enid Joske (1928–51)
 Miss Mary Bagnall (1952–57)
 Miss Margaret Dewey (1959–62)
 Dr Eva Eden (1964–83)
 Mrs Phyllis Fry (1984–95)
 Dr Gail Tulloch (1996-2000)
 Dr Damian Powell (2001-2021)
 Dr Eleanor Spencer-Regan (2022-current)

People associated with the college

College visitor
The current college visitor is Peter C. Doherty, winner of a Nobel Prize and Australian of the Year in 1997.

Notable alumni
Elizabeth Blackburn, Morris Herzstein Professor of Biology and Physiology at the University of California, San Francisco, winner of the Nobel Prize in Medicine in 2009
Marita Cheng, Young Australian of the Year
Adrienne Clarke, former Lieutenant Governor of Victoria and Chancellor of La Trobe University
Helen Garner, writer
Thenu Herath, CEO of Oaktree, the youth-run international development agency
Dame Leonie Kramer, former Chancellor of the University of Sydney
Diane Lemaire, aeronautical engineer, first woman to graduate from the University of Melbourne with a degree in engineering
Fay Marles, Victorian Commissioner of Equal Opportunity from 1977 to 1987 and Chancellor of the University of Melbourne from 2001 to 2004
Gillian Triggs, former President of the Australian Human Rights Commission
Hugh Williams, Melbourne Business School's first Melbourne Enterprise Professor and former Vice-President, Google
Sally Walker, former Vice-Chancellor of Deakin University
Peter Yates, former CEO of PBL

Tutors
Former tutors include:

Manning Clark, historian
Marilyn Warren, Chief Justice of the Supreme Court of Victoria

References

External links

Official website

Residential colleges of the University of Melbourne